The 2007 Harlequins Rugby League season was the twenty-eighth in the club's history and their twelfth season in the Super League. The club was coached by Brian McDermott, competing in Super League XII, finishing in 7th place and reaching the Quarter-finals round of the 2007 Challenge Cup.

Super League XII table

1Bradford deducted 2 points for breaching of salary cap rules.

2Wigan deducted 4 points for breaching salary cap rules.

2007 Season players

2007 Signings & transfers
Gains

Losses

2008 Gains & losses

Re-Signings

2008 Losses

2008 Gains

References

External links
London Broncos - Rugby League Project
Harlequins RL

London Broncos seasons
Harlequins Rugby League season